The California Congress of Republicans ("CCR") is a "grass roots" coalition of Republicans in the state of California and is officially charted by the California Republican Party. It was founded by former officials of the California Republican Assembly who felt CRA had become a single-issue organization. It is considered more socially inclusive than other Republican groups.   According to its website, "CCR stresses the inclusion of divergent views among Republicans. We agree with Ronald Reagan: If we agree with each other 80 percent of the time, we should overcome the 20 percent of disagreement. We strive to INCLUDE (not exclude) all Republicans, and we extend our appeal to independent voters. We are the natural volunteer home for most Republicans in California and we are a strong recruiter for others to join our party." CCR describes its philosophy as "based on core Republican values: individual responsibility, personal freedoms, limited government, a market economy, low taxes, and strong national defense. We don’t play politics with personal and religious social issues, leaving those to the practice of personal freedoms."

The group has chapters throughout the state, including the South Peninsula Area Republicans (SPARC), the Republican Club of Ocean Hills, Hollywood Congress of Republicans, Shasta Congress of Republicans (Shasta County), Republicans of River City (Sacramento County), Santa Clarita Valley Congress of Republicans, Orange County Congress of Republicans, Hemet-San Jacinto Congress of Republicans, East Valley Congress of Republicans, Central Coast Congress of Republicans, Bakersfield Congress of Republicans and others.

Past presidents include Peter Coe Verbica (2018-2019), Mark Vafiades (2009-2010), Bonnie Shea (2007-2008), Carl Burton (2005-2006), Pamela Corradi (2003-2005), Dennis Catron (2000-2002), James Bratt, Stuart Posselt, Patty Kelly and Robin Lowe.

In 2019, CCR was the only broad-based, statewide, grassroots, chartered organization which endorsed Jessica Patterson a Latina who won the race for California Republican Party (CRP) Chair; she is the first female elected to the position.  CCR held its 2018 Endorsing Convention in Aptos, California to a standing-room only audience; the event sponsors included members of the Santa Cruz Republican Central Committee and the Lincoln Club of Northern California.  CCR's 2019 Special Convention, held in Sacramento at the Hyatt Regency, hosted CCR officers, delegates, members, guests and CRP statewide officer candidates; the event was so well attended that extra chairs had to be brought in by the hotel to accommodate attendees.

References

External links
California Congress of Republicans website

Republican Party (United States) organizations
Politics of California